The Mono County Courthouse, on Main St. in Bridgeport, California, is a historic Italianate-style building that was built in 1880.

It is a -story building with dimensions .  It was designed by architect J. R. Roberts and was built for total cost of $31,000.
It was listed on the National Register of Historic Places in 1974.

References

External links

County courthouses in California
Buildings and structures in Mono County, California
Government buildings completed in 1880
History of Mono County, California
Courthouses on the National Register of Historic Places in California
Italianate architecture in California
National Register of Historic Places in Mono County, California